Gareth Michael Grant (born 6 September 1980) is an English former footballer who played as a striker.

He played as a professional in the Premier League and the Football League for Bradford City, Halifax Town and Lincoln City. He also had spells as a professional with Bolton Wanderers and Chester City in which he did not make an appearance. He went on to feature in Non-league football with notable spells with Gainsborough Trinity,  
Harrogate Town and Farsley Celtic. He also had spells with Scarborough, Droylsden, Ossett Town, Pontefract Collieries and Frickley Athletic.

Career
Grant made 30 appearances in the Football League for Bradford City, Halifax Town and Lincoln City. At Bradford he scored three goals, against FK Atlantas in the Intertoto Cup, Darlington in the League Cup and Portsmouth in the league. During his spell with Lincoln he scored once against Chesterfield in the Football League Trophy. After Lincoln, he played in non-league football for Chester City, for whom he made one start and scored two goals in the Cheshire Senior Cup against Cheadle Town. Grant also played for Gainsborough Trinity and Harrogate Town, where he scored 15 goals from 43 appearances in all competitions in the 2005–06 season. In the summer of 2006, Grant moved to Farsley Celtic and helped them to gain promotion to the Conference National in 2007, including scoring a goal in the play-off final win of that year. In February 2008, Grant re-signed for Harrogate Town in time for him to face his former team Gainsborough Trinity. He was released later that year, then spent nearly a year out of football before rejoining Farsley Celtic in March 2009. On 13 March 2010 Grant signed alongside his Farsley strike partner Lee Ellington for fellow Conference North side Droylsden, but left shortly afterwards to join former club Gainsborough Trinity. On 1 July 2010 he joined Farsley, moving on to join Ossett Town in July 2013.

In March 2014 he joined Frickley Athletic.

Notes
A.  These figures only include seasons in the Conference National, so are incomplete.

References

External links

 (Farsley Celtic stats only)
Chester City 'What happened to...?' article (2003)
2008 interview on Farsley Today
Lincoln City F.C. Official Archive Profile

1980 births
Living people
Footballers from Leeds
English footballers
Association football forwards
Bradford City A.F.C. players
Halifax Town A.F.C. players
Bolton Wanderers F.C. players
Lincoln City F.C. players
Gainsborough Trinity F.C. players
Chester City F.C. players
Scarborough F.C. players
Harrogate Town A.F.C. players
Farsley Celtic A.F.C. players
Droylsden F.C. players
Farsley Celtic F.C. players
Ossett Town F.C. players
Premier League players
English Football League players
National League (English football) players
Northern Premier League players
Pontefract Collieries F.C. players
Frickley Athletic F.C. players